Errol Lewis Hastings (born in 1994) is a Northern Irish baker from Northern Ireland, best known for being Chief Artisan Baker of Sainsbury's since 2014.
 
He has worked as a baker since taking up the career as a teenager with an apprenticeship at Ashers Baking Company and has gone on to become head baker at a number of Sainsbury's stores around Britain. After returning from working in London, Hastings began creating recipes as Chief Artisan Baker at Sainsbury's.

References

Sainsbury's people
British bakers
1994 births
Living people
Businesspeople from Belfast
People educated at Wellington College Belfast